Seán O'Connor (born 22 August 1996) is an Irish rugby union player. He can play as either a lock or a flanker and represents Jersey Reds in the RFU Championship.

Early life
O'Connor was born in Clonmel, County Tipperary and first played rugby aged 6 with Cashel RFC. He attended Rockwell College and played three years of Junior and Senior Cup rugby, winning the latter as captain in 2015 when Rockwell beat Ardscoil Rís 23–13 in the final.

Professional career

Munster
On 11 November 2016, O'Connor made his competitive debut for Munster when he came on as a substitute against Māori All Blacks in a capped friendly in Thomond Park, which Munster won 27–14. O'Connor made his first start for Munster on 1 September 2017, doing so in the sides opening fixture of the 2017–18 Pro14 against Benetton. He joined the senior squad on a one-year development contract for the 2019–20 season.

Jersey Reds
O'Connor left Munster at end of the 2019–20 season and joined RFU Championship side Jersey Reds ahead of the 2020–21 season.

Ireland
O'Connor represented Ireland U20 at the 2016 World Rugby Under 20 Championship, coming on as a replacement in the famous 33–24 win against New Zealand U20, the team's first win against their Kiwi opponents in history.

References

External links
Munster Senior Profile
Munster Academy Profile
Pro14 Profile
U20 Six Nations Profile

Living people
1996 births
People educated at Rockwell College
Alumni of Cork Institute of Technology
Rugby union players from County Tipperary
Irish rugby union players
Garryowen Football Club players
Munster Rugby players
Jersey Reds players
Rugby union locks
Irish expatriate rugby union players
Irish expatriate sportspeople in England
Expatriate rugby union players in England
People from Clonmel
Expatriate rugby union players in Jersey
Irish expatriate sportspeople in Jersey